Watson is an unincorporated community in McCurtain County, Oklahoma, United States. It is located along State Highway 4 in northeastern McCurtain County. Watson has a post office, which was established on January 25, 1908. It remains operational and uses the ZIP code 74963.

References

External links
 
 

Unincorporated communities in McCurtain County, Oklahoma
Unincorporated communities in Oklahoma